Zeatin is a cytokinin derived from adenine, which occurs in the form of a cis- and a trans-isomer and conjugates. Zeatin was discovered in immature corn kernels from the genus Zea. It promotes growth of lateral buds and when sprayed on meristems stimulates cell division to produce bushier plants.

Occurrence 
Zeatin and its derivatives occur in many plant extracts and are the active ingredient in coconut milk, which causes plant growth.

6-(γ,γ-Dimethylallylamino)purine is a zeatin precursor.

Application 
Zeatin has a variety of effects including:
 Promotes callus initiation when combined with auxin, concentration 1 ppm.
 Promotes fruit set. Zeatin 100 ppm + GA3 500 ppm + NAA 20 ppm, sprayed at 10th, 25th, 40th day after blossom.
 Retards yellowing for vegetables, 20 ppm, sprayed.
 Causes auxiliary stems to grow and flower.

Zeatin can also be applied to stimulate seed germination and seedling growth.

Zeatin has also been shown to promote the resistance of tobacco against the bacterial pathogen Pseudomonas syringae, in which trans-zeatin has a more prominent effect than cis-zeatin.

References

External links 
 Cytokinins

Cytokinins
Purines
Aging-related substances in plants
Plant growth regulators